Clément Maynadier (born 11 October 1988) is a French rugby union Hooker and he currently plays for Bordeaux Bègles and the France national team.
He has finished École des mines d'Albi-Carmaux and works as an engineer at Safran Aircraft Engines.

International career
Maynadier made his debut for France in June 2016 and was part of the squad for the 2017 Six Nations Championship.

References

External links
France profile at FFR
L'Équipe profile
ESPN Profile

1988 births
Living people
French rugby union players
France international rugby union players
Rugby union hookers
Rugby union players from Toulouse
Union Bordeaux Bègles players
SC Albi players